Lows Lake can refer to the following lakes in the United States:
Lows Lake (Minnesota), a lake in Crow Wing County, Minnesota
Lows Lake (New York), a reservoir in St. Lawrence County